Tamilmaran a/l Manimaran (born 16 September 1997) is a Malaysian footballer who plays as a wing-back for Petaling Jaya City in the Malaysia Super League.

Club career

Early year

Born in Selangor, Tamil played as a youth for Selangor at the age of 16. He progressed through the youth system and was part of the team that finished as a champions of the President Cup in 2017.

Selangor

Tamil quickly progressed through the youth ranks and the reserve team at Selangor and impressed enough to earn a first team debut at the age of 20. He made his first senior appearance against Penang in 28 October 2017 in a Super League match, playing full 90-minutes.

On 27 November 2017, Selangor under-21 manager, Ariffin Ab Hamid confirmed that Tamil would be definitely promoted to Selangor's first team for 2018 season.

Petaling Jaya City

After spend three years with Selangor, Tamil change sides to join Petaling Jaya City for a find new challenge.

Career statistics

Club

1 Includes Malaysia FA Cup matches.
2 Includes Malaysia Cup matches.

Honours

Club
Selangor
 President Cup (1): 2017

References

External links
 
 Profile at faselangor.my

1997 births
Living people
Malaysian footballers
Selangor FA players
Petaling Jaya City FC players
Malaysia Super League players
Malaysian people of Malay descent
People from Selangor
Association football wingers
Association football midfielders